Haec dies quam fecit Dominus, or This is the day which the Lord hath made, may refer to:

Haec dies
 verse 24 of Psalm 118, from which comes a gradual associated with Easter
 three compositions by Giovanni Pierluigi da Palestrina
 two compositions by Jan Dismas Zelenka
 a composition perhaps by Nicolas Bernier
 a composition by Otto Albert Tichý
 a composition by Johann David Heinichen
 a composition by John Ensdale in the Gyffard partbooks
 a composition by Marc-Antoine Charpentier
 a composition by William Byrd
 a track on the 1976 Gregorian chant album Paschale Mysterium 
 part of Credo (Penderecki) by Penderecki

This is the day that the Lord hath made
 "This is the day that the Lord hath made", a song by John W. Peterson
 This is the day which the Lord hath made (Handel) or Wedding anthem for Princess Anne

See also
Mark Barkworth, Catholic priest and martyr (c. 1572 – 1601), sang Haec dies on the way to his execution
Charles-Marie Widor's Symphonie Romane has Haec dies woven throughout all four movements